Gary John Braid (born 25 July 1960) is a New Zealand former rugby footballer who represented his country in rugby union. His two sons, Luke and Daniel, both play rugby union

Rugby union career
Braid attended Otumoetai College where he played soccer before taking up rugby union and making the first XV in his last year at high school. Braid made his debut for Bay of Plenty in 1981 as a flanker before moving to lock. Braid made the All Blacks in 1983 and played in eleven games including in two test matches.

He was loaned to North Harbor in 1986. Braid was made captain of the Bay of Plenty in 1991.

Rugby league career
Braid switched codes to rugby league in 1992, joining the Ngongotaha Chiefs in the Bay of Plenty Rugby League competition.

Later years
Braid currently owns the "Kingslander" pub in Kingsland, New Zealand. He coached Auckland University RFC in the Auckland Premier competition in 2002-2003.
In 2018/2019 season he joined Rugby Club Ljubljana (Slovenia) as a head coach of their senior side.

References

Living people
New Zealand rugby league players
1960 births
New Zealand rugby union players
New Zealand international rugby union players
Bay of Plenty rugby union players
North Harbour rugby union players
Ngongotaha Chiefs players
People educated at Otumoetai College
Rugby league second-rows